Codium laminarioides is a species of seaweed in the Codiaceae family.

In Western Australia is found along the coast in Mid West down the west coast and then along the south coast as far as South Australia.

References

laminarioides
Plants described in 1855